Poland at the European Track Championships is an overview of the results from Poland at the European Track Championships.

European Track Championships (elite) 2010-current

Medalists 
This a list of medals won at the UEC European Track Championships for elite riders from 2010 to current.

Medals by year

Most successful Polish competitors

See also

 Belarus at the European Track Championships
 Netherlands at the European Track Championships

References

Cycle racing in Poland
Nations at the European Track Championships